Challenge! is the debut studio album by Japanese rock band Flower Travellin' Band, then called Yuya Uchida & The Flowers, released in 1969. It features mainly cover songs, and was a means for Yuya Uchida to explore the emerging psychedelic rock movement outside his own career, and to introduce the work of upcoming Western bands such as Cream, Big Brother and the Holding Company, The Jimi Hendrix Experience, Jefferson Airplane to a Japanese audience. It was named number 34 on Bounces 2009 list of 54 Standard Japanese Rock Albums.

Overview
Shocked after seeing Jimi Hendrix perform in London in 1967, Yuya Uchida returned home and wanted to introduce a similar sound to Japan. He formed "the Flowers" as a cover band with various group sounds musicians, and two vocalists; male singer  Hiroshi Chiba and female singer Remi Aso. The album also gained notoriety for featuring all of the band members nude on the cover.

Following its release, Uchida dropped all the members, except drummer George Wada, recruited guitarist Hideki Ishima, vocalist Joe Yamanaka and bassist Jun Kobayashi, and formed the Flower Travellin' Band as a band that would appeal to international audiences. Uchida himself reverted exclusively to the producer/manager role. Their first album, Anywhere, mirrored Challenge! by mainly consisting of cover songs and nude cover art.

On September 26, 2007, a limited edition of Challenge! was released with five bonus tracks. They are "Last Chance", "Flower Boy" and "Yogiri no Trumpet" which were previously released as singles in 1969, and the previously unreleased covers of "Fire" and "Five to One".

Track listing

Personnel 
Remi Aso – vocals, guitar
Kento Nakamura – vocals
Ken Hashimoto – bass
Susumu Oku – guitar, vocals
Katsuhiko Kobayashi – steel guitar
Yuya Uchida – percussion, backing vocals, producer
Joji "George" Wada – drums

References

Flower Travellin' Band albums
1969 debut albums
Nippon Columbia albums
Covers albums